Jagot may refer to:

Grégoire Jagot (1750-1838), politician during the French revolution.
Jagot colony, a small town or settlement in Gilgit district of Gilgit-Baltistan.

Jayne Jagot, is an Australian judge.
Paul-Clément Jagot (1889-1962), a French occultist.